Juliana Young Koo, born Yen Yu-yun (September 26, 1905 – May 24, 2017), was a Chinese-American diplomat who worked in the UN Protocol Department.  Her first husband, Chinese diplomat Clarence Kuangson Young was executed by Japanese armies during World War II. She became the long-term mistress for the diplomat and politician V.K. Wellington Koo, long before her husband's death. After the war, she moved to the United States, in 1956 Koo divorced his wife and married her.

Early life
On September 26, 1905, Koo was born into a wealthy family with business and government ties in Tianjin, China as Yen Yu-yün (or Yan Youyun). Her father  (1872–1931) and her grandfather  (1838–1907) were both prominent businessmen, her mother was a concubine. Later in 1919, her father's wife passed away, and her mother because her father's second wife. She attended Keen School at the same year.

She was one of the first women to graduate from Fudan University. At university, a special car took her to campus and brought her back, since its number was 84, the male students nicknamed her "Miss 84".

Marriages and career
She married Clarence Kuangson Young ) on September 6, 1929. In the 1930s, she became the mistress of Chinese diplomat V.K. Wellington Koo. The scandal resulted in Young's being transferred to the Chinese consul general in Manila from 1939 to 1942. Young was arrested by the Japanese during World War II and executed on April 17, 1942 together with 7 consulate staff. After the death of her husband, she took her three daughters to the U.S and became Koo's mistress again. Per Koo's arrangement, she worked at the United Nations in New York. In 1956, Koo divorced his wife and married her in September 1959.

Children
Koo had three daughters with Clarence Young: Genevieve, Shirley, and Frances.

Geneviene Young (1930-2020) was a book editor most known for Love Story by Erich Segal. She was married to Cedric Sun and Gordon Parks (from 1973 to 1979). Both marriages ended in divorce, but she and Parks remained close until Parks' death in 2006. She helped establish the Gordon Parks Foundation after Parks' death and continued to oversee the foundation and Parks' estate until her death in February 2020.

Shirley Young (1935-2020) was a prominent business executive for Grey Advertising and General Motors. She was married to George Hsieh and Norman Krandall. Both marriages ended in divorce. She died in December 2020 and was survived by three sons (all with Hsieh) and seven grandchildren.

Frances Young (1940-1992) was a philanthropist and preservationist. She was married to Oscar Tang (son of Tang Ping-yuan). In 2000, Tang gave $10.2 million for the Frances Young Tang Teaching Museum and Art Gallery at Frances' alma mater Skidmore College. A gallery at the Metropolitan Museum of Art is also named after her.

Autobiography
She released her autobiography titled 109 Springtimes: My Story in 2015. On September 26, 2015, Koo became a supercentenarian, when she reached the age of 110 years.

According to her the secret to her longevity was eating foie gras, beef, pork belly and "as much butter as you like." She also advised against exercise and vegetables. She also suggested regular bouts of mahjong, a game she liked to play.

Personal life 
On May 24, 2017 (more than 75 years after her first husband's execution), Koo died in Manhattan, New York City, New York. She was 111 years, 240 days old.

References

1905 births
2017 deaths
American diplomats
American supercentenarians
Chinese diplomats
Chinese emigrants to the United States
Chinese supercentenarians
Women supercentenarians
Fudan University alumni
Writers from Tianjin
Chinese autobiographers
University of Shanghai alumni